The Curtiss V-8 motorcycle was a  V8 engine-powered motorcycle designed and built by aviation and motorcycling pioneer Glenn Curtiss that set an unofficial land speed record of  on January 24, 1907. The air-cooled F-head engine was developed for use in dirigibles.

Engine
The forty horsepower engine was the two carburetor version of the Curtiss Model B-8 aircraft powerplant, one of thirteen engines listed in the May 1908 "Aerial and Cycle Motors" catalog. An eight carburetor version of the Model B-8 was used in the experimental AEA Red Wing and White Wing airplanes that flew in 1908.

Legacy
Curtiss remained "the fastest man in the world," the title the newspapers gave him for going faster than any vehicle, on land, sea or air, until 1911, when his absolute record was broken by the  Blitzen Benz automobile. No motorcycle surpassed the record until 1930. Curtiss's success at racing strengthened his reputation as a leading maker of high-performance motorcycles and engines.

It has been suggested that the literary character Tom Swift was based on Curtiss.  Tom Swift and His Motor Cycle, the first of over 100 books in the Tom Swift series, was published shortly after the V-8 record setting run.

The record setting V-8 motorcycle is now in the Smithsonian's National Air and Space Museum. The Air and Space museum lent it to the Guggenheim for the 1998 The Art of the Motorcycle exhibition in New York.

The Curtiss OX-5 aero engine, a successor of the V-8 motorcycle engine, powered several United States civilian and military aircraft. More than 10,000 were manufactured.

See also
Motorcycle land-speed record
Land speed record
List of motorcycles of 1900 to 1909

References

Bibliography

 Hatch, Alden. Glenn Curtiss: Pioneer of Aviation. Guilford, Connecticut: The Lyons Press, 2007. .
 Roseberry, C.R. Glenn Curtiss: Pioneer of Flight. Garden City, New York: Doubleday & Company, 1972. .

Further reading

External links

Motorcycles introduced in the 1900s
Motorcycles of the United States
Land speed record motorcycles
Eight-cylinder motorcycles